Hauger is a Norwegian surname, derived from the Old Norse word haugr meaning hill, knoll, or mound. Related derivatives include the common Norwegian surnames Haugan,  Hauge and  Haugen. Notable people with the surname include:

Art Hauger (1893-1944), American major league baseball player 
Dennis Hauger (born 2003), Norwegian racing driver
Folke Hauger Johannessen (1913–1997), Norwegian military officer and admiral of the Royal Norwegian Navy 
Henning Hauger (born 1985), Norwegian professional football midfielder
Torill Thorstad Hauger (1943-2014), Norwegian writer and illustrator

See also
Hauger BK, bandy club from Bærum, Norway
Hauger FK, football club from Bærum, Norway
Hauger (station), station on the rapid transit system of Oslo, Norway

Norwegian-language surnames